Encapsulation may refer to:

Chemistry 
 Molecular encapsulation, in chemistry, the confinement of an individual molecule within a larger molecule
 Micro-encapsulation, in material science, the coating of microscopic particles with another material

Biology 
 Cell encapsulation, technology made to overcome the existing problem of graft rejection in tissue engineering applications

Computing and electronics 
 An alternate term for conformal coating or potting, which protects electronic components
 Encapsulation (networking), the process of adding control information as it passes through the layered model
 Encapsulation (computer programming), the combination of program code and data, and/or restriction (hide) of access to data except through dedicated code

he:כימוס